Oakland Assembly may refer to:

 Oakland Assembly, a former Chevrolet manufacturing plant, Oakland, California
 Oakland Assembly Food Court Venue, a food hall planned for opening in summer 2021 in Oakland, California